Canasvieiras is a neighbourhood and beach located in southern Brazil, approximately  north-east of the city of Florianópolis on the northern part of Santa Catarina Island. Nearby beaches include Jurerê and Cachoeira do Bom Jesus. The population is 10,129, and the area is 29.0 km² (11.1 square miles)

One account suggests the area is named after Mr Vieira who owned a sugar cane plantation in the town, but historically it is more likely that it was named for a variety of cane cultivated in the region, known in Portuguese as "cana-viera". A 1786 map identifies the beach as "Praia Cana Vieiras".

During the summer Canasvieiras is popular with tourists, especially those from Argentina but also those from Chile and Uruguay, because of the calm seas and the nightlife. The area has accommodation, bathhouses and shops (many of which have bilingual attendants), a police station and a health clinic.

References
 Gomelsky, Victoria. (7 November 2004) The New York Times Finding Her Brazilian Groove. Section: 5; Page 510.
 Frayssinet, Fabiana. (13 March 2008) Inter Press Service Environment-Brazil: Development vs. Preservation in Florianopolis.

Beaches of Florianópolis
Neighbourhoods in Florianópolis